拉麵, 拉面, or 拉麺 may refer to:
Lamian, handmade or hand-pulled Chinese noodles, and the dish made from these noodles
Ramen, a Japanese dish of noodles served in broth